also known by  and his Chinese style name , was a bureaucrat of the Ryukyu Kingdom.

Anji was the second son of Ikegusuku Ansei. In 1673, Onna magiri (modern Onna, Okinawa) was established, and granted to Anji as his hereditary fief. He was the originator of Mō-uji Sadoyama Dunchi.

He was sent to Miyako and Yaeyama to carry out political reform in 1678. King Shō Tei dispatched Prince Nago Chōgen (also known as Shō Kōjin ) and him in 1682 to celebrate Tokugawa Tsunayoshi succeeded as shōgun of the Tokugawa shogunate. In the next year, Prince Nago died in Kagoshima, and Anji sailed back to Ryukyu.

Anji served as a member of Sanshikan from 1688 to 1693.

References

Ueekata
Sanshikan
People of the Ryukyu Kingdom
Ryukyuan people
17th-century Ryukyuan people